Tsar Ivan the Terrible is a 1991 Soviet drama film directed by Gennady Vasilyev.

Plot 
The film tells about Ivan the Terrible and his brutal rule of Russia.

Cast 
 Kakhi Kavsadze as Tsar Ivan the Terrible
 Igor Talkov as Prince Serebryany
 Larisa Shakhvorostova as Yelena (as Larisa Totunova)
 Stanislav Lyubshin as Morozov
 Andrey Martynov as Malyuta Skuratov
 Andrey Sokolov as Vyazemsky
 Dmitri Pisarenko as Fyodor Basmanov
 Andrey Tolubeyev as Boris Godunov
 Nikolay Kryuchkov as Korshin
 Vladimir Antonik as Persten
 Valery Garkalin as Vaska Gryaznoy
 Galiks Kolchitsky as Philip II, Metropolitan of Moscow (voiced by Rogvold Sukhoverko)
 Sergei Kolesnikov as Khlopko, the robber
 Ivan Ryzhov as the miller-sorcerer
 Zoya Buryak  as Pasha 
 Stefaniya Stanyuta as Anufrievna
 Valentina Titova as abbess of the monastery
 Olga Drozdova as Anastasia Romanovna
 Nikolay Smorchkov as archer

References

External links 
 

1991 films
1990s Russian-language films
Cultural depictions of Ivan the Terrible
1991 drama films
1990s historical drama films
Soviet historical drama films
Films set in Russia
Films set in Moscow
Films set in the 16th century
Films based on Russian novels